Manny  is a masculine nickname or given name. 

Manny may also refer to:

 Baron Manny, a title in the Peerage of England
 Walter Manny, 1st Baron Manny (died 1372), soldier of fortune and founder of the Charterhouse
 John Henry Manny (1825–1856), American inventor of the Manny Reaper
 Manny (TV series), a 2011 South Korean television series by tvN
 Manny (film), a 2014 documentary film about Filipino boxer Manny Pacquiao
 The Manny, a 2015 German film
 The Manny (TV series), a fictional TV series